Pyramid Peak, is the highest peak in the range of the Pyramid Mountains at , in Hidalgo County, New Mexico.
Pyramid Peak is located 7.5 miles south of Lordsburg in the Pyramid Mountains. It has also been called Big Pyramid Mountain and North Pyramid Peak.

References

Landforms of Hidalgo County, New Mexico
Mountains of New Mexico
Mountains of Hidalgo County, New Mexico